Lists of national institutions cover various transnational lists associated with nation states. These include lists related to government, services, sports and culture.

Government

Lists of countries and territories
List of sovereign states
Member states of the United Nations
List of national border changes since World War I
List of national capitals
List of national constitutions
List of national governments
List of current heads of state and government
List of legislatures by country
List of supreme courts by country

Services

List of national and international statistical services
List of national archives
Flag carrier#List of flag-carrying airlines
List of law enforcement agencies
List of national and state libraries
List of national newspapers
List of national parks
List of national parks in the Alps

Sports

National sport
List of women's national association football teams
List of men's national association football teams
List of International Rugby League members
List of international rugby union teams
List of NHL statistical leaders by country
List of national netball teams

Culture

National poet
National poetry 
State religion
List of national theatres

References